The 1949 Marshall Thundering Herd football team was an American football team that represented Marshall University in the Ohio Valley Conference (OVC) during the 1949 college football season. In its 12th season under head coach Cam Henderson, the team compiled a 6–4 record (4–0 against conference opponents) and outscored opponents by a total of 168 to 147. Marvin Wetzel and Danny Clark were the team captains.

Schedule

References

Marshall
Marshall Thundering Herd football seasons
Marshall Thundering Herd football